The TVR Cerbera is a grand touring hardtop sports car manufactured by British automobile manufacturer TVR between 1996 and 2006. The name is derived from Cerberus, the three-headed beast of Greek legend that guarded the entrance of Hades.

Introduced at the 1993 London Motor Show, the Cerbera was the third car manufactured by TVR under the leadership of Peter Wheeler (the first was the Griffith and the second was the Chimaera). The car represented three firsts for the Wheeler-led company:

The first hard-top—the Griffith and the Chimaera were both convertibles
The first 2+2—TVRs were traditionally two-seaters
The first to be powered by TVR's own engines—historically, TVR had purchased engines from mainstream manufacturers like Rover, Ford and Triumph

Engines

Prior to the Cerbera, TVR had purchased V8 engines from Rover and then tuned them for their own use. When Rover was purchased by BMW, Peter Wheeler did not want to risk supply chain problems should the Germans decide to stop manufacturing the engine. In response, he engaged the services of race engineer Al Melling to design a V8 engine that TVR could manufacture in-house and even potentially offer for sale to other car-makers. In an interview for the television programme Top Gear, Wheeler explained "Basically, we designed the engine as a race engine. It was my idea at the time that if we wanted to expand, we ought to make something that we could sell to other people. We've ended up with a 75-degree V8 with a flat-plane crank. The bottom-half of the engine to the heads is exactly as you would see in current Formula One engines."

The AJP8 has one of the highest specific outputs of any naturally aspirated V8 in the automotive world at 83.3 hp/litre for the 4.2 and 93.3 hp/litre for the 4.5. Later models of the 4.5 litre engine had the 'Red Rose' option, which increased output to  97.7 hp/litre when run with super-unleaded (high octane) petrol. An unmarked button on the dashboard altered the engine mapping.

The engine is also unusually compact for a V8.

Following the success of the Speed Eight engine program, Peter Wheeler also undertook the design of a "Speed Six" engine. This engine also made its debut in the Cerbera but was a 4.0 litre inline slant six design with four valves per cylinder to the Speed Eight's two. The early engines proved too unreliable with many requiring a rebuild.

Specifications 

The Cerbera was designed from the start as a four-seater. The rear seats are smaller than the front, a design commonly referred to as a "2+2". However, the interior is designed so that the passenger seat can slide farther forward than the driver's seat. This allows more room for the person sitting behind the front passenger. TVR have referred to the layout as a "3+1" design.

The dashboard was designed especially for the Cerbera and uses a two-spar steering wheel as opposed to the typical three-spar previously found in most TVRs. The reason for this is that minor instruments are located on a small panel below the steering wheel and a third spar in the wheel would have made them difficult to read.

Like all TVRs of the Peter Wheeler era, the Cerbera had a long-travel throttle to compensate for the lack of electronic traction-control and very sharp steering. The V8 powered cars were two turns from lock to lock and the Speed Six car was 2.4 turns.  This made it easier for experienced drivers to maintain or regain control of the car in the event of a loss of traction but some less experienced drivers complained that it made the cars feel "twitchy" and more responsive than they would otherwise have preferred.

In 2000, TVR changed the styling of the car slightly by modifying the headlights to more closely resemble those seen on the Tuscan. The "facelift" features were available with all three engine configurations. In addition, the cars equipped with the 4.5 litre engine were offered with the "lightweight" option, reducing the overall weight through the use of lighter body panels and a slightly reworked interior.

Performance

The Last Cerbera 
In August 2006, TVR held an online auction for what it billed as "The Last Cerbera".  According to thelastcerbera.com, the website that TVR created especially for the auction, TVR's owner and chairman, Nikolay Smolensky brought the design out of retirement for one more unit as an homage to the "beautiful but brutish bygone British sports car." The "last Cerbera" was a 4.5 Lightweight right-hand drive car in Pepper white with Prussian blue leather interior trim. The auction failed to meet its reserve price but TVR still decided to sell the car to the high bidder. The final bid was under £45,000 to which 5% plus 17.5% VAT would be added.

Cerbera Speed 12 

The TVR Cerbera Speed 12, originally known as the Project 7/12, is a high performance sports car designed by TVR in 1997. Based on the TVR Cerbera, the vehicle was intended to be both the world's highest performance road car and the basis for a GT1 class endurance racer. However, problems during its development, changing GT1 class regulations and the eventual decision that it was simply incapable of being used as a road car forced TVR executives to abandon its development.

The engine, displacing 7.7 L (469.9 cu in) and having twelve cylinders, was reportedly capable of producing nearly 1,000 hp (746 kW), although an exact measurement was never made. Nonetheless, it was claimed to have a top speed greater than that of the McLaren F1.

References
Sources

Notes
Top Gear review of the TVR Cerbera by Jeremy Clarkson
Classics & Sports Car Magazine, May 2004

External links

 TVR Cerbera info 
 TVR Cerbera on Wheeler Dealers

Cerbera
Rear-wheel-drive vehicles
Coupés
2000s cars
Cars introduced in 1996
Grand tourers